The Zoo is a New Zealand observational documentary series, made by Greenstone TV, that follows the lives of Auckland Zoo's animals and zookeepers. The series explores the new arrivals and births of Auckland Zoo, to the fights, illnesses and mating rituals, how the animals are fed and how they live. The series' production crew are based full-time at the zoo, but the series also follows zookeepers overseas on zoo-related trips.

The Zoo  returned to New Zealand's TV One in 2013 for its 13th season. In the UK, it airs on Animal Planet.

Zoo staff

Season 12 staff stars
Christine Tintinger - Senior Primate keeper
Amy Robbins - Team Leader of Primates
Nat Sullivan - Team Leader of Pridelands
Andrew Coers - Team Leader of Elephants and Sea Lions
Bethany Jackson - Vet-in-residence
Richard Gibson - Team Leader of Reptiles and Invertebrates
Natalie Clark - NZ Birds Keeper

Main staff stars
Sandra Rice - Senior Carnivore keeper
Carly Day - Primate keeper
Laurel Sandy - Elephant & Sea Lion keeper
Richard Gibson- Team leader of reptiles and invertebrates
Rickard Jakob Hoff - Senior Veterinarian - Conservation and Research
John Potter - Senior Veterinarian

Former staff stars
Zoo keepers who have previously starred on the show.
Trent Barclay - Senior Carnivore keeper (departed Auckland Zoo)
Maria Barclay - Senior Vet nurse (departed Auckland Zoo)
Sam Stephens - Senior Pridelands keeper (now working at Hamilton Zoo, appears on Wild Vets)
Mike Harvey - Keeper
Tania Crook - Keeper
Brooke Noonan - Curator
Maria Finnagan - Curator

Animals

Current animal stars (series 12)
Oz (Sumatran tiger)
Molek (Sumatran tiger)
Berani (Sumatran tiger)
Doris (alligator)
Osiris (cheetah)
Anubis (cheetah)
Janie (chimpanzee)
Burma (elephant)
Kaioko (fur seal)
Moana (fur seal)
Orua (fur seal)
Atamai (fur seal)
Jelani (giraffe)
Zubulu (giraffe)
Rukiya (giraffe)
Kiraka (giraffe)
Nakuru (giraffe)
Faith (hippo)
Fudge (hippo)
Maya (red panda)
Mosi (meerkat)
Shiloh (zebra)
Charlie (orang-utan)
Melur (orang-utan)
Madju (orang-utan)
Wanita (orang-utan)

Former animal stars
Snorkel (hippo)- euthanized 1 October 2010
Kashin (elephant) - euthanized 24th Aug 2009
Nisha (sumatran tiger) - *eta deceased May 12, 2006
Hari (Asiatic golden cat) - departed Auckland Zoo
Hoi-An (Asiatic golden Cat) - departed Auckland Zoo
Saigon (Asiatic golden Cat) - departed Auckland Zoo
Indra (25-year-old Bornean orangutan) - departed Auckland Zoo

Seasons

Season 1 (1999)
The premiere season of The Zoo.

2004
This season premiered on TV2 on Sunday 5 September.

Season 8 (2006)

Season 9 (2007)

Season 10 (2008)
This series aired on TV2.

Season 11 (2010)

Season 12 (2012)
Premiered on Sunday 29 July 2012.
Currently airs on TV One at 7pm on Sundays.

Specials

Zoo Babies (2002)
This 1-hour The Zoo special takes a look at pregnancy, birth and infancy at Auckland Zoo. Explores the successes and failures of trying to breed giraffes, lions, orang-utans, tigers, pink flamingos and the native New Zealand tuatara.

Zoo Babies 2: Raising Baby Iwani (2005)
The story of Baby Iwani, the siamang gibbon, who was rejected by his mother and 'adopted' by zookeeper Christine Tintinger. This 60-minute special leads up to the day Christine has to give him back to Mum.

Spin-off series

Two By Two At The Zoo (2005)
Two By Two At The Zoo is a series made up of ten episodes of specials from The Zoo series. Two By Two At The Zoo explores Auckland Zoo's favourite animals and the keepers who care for them.

Episodes
Episode 1: Red Panda babies
Episode 2: Treating Kashin
Episode 3: Rhino enclosure
Episode 4: tea party chimps
Episode 5: Kiwi Breeding Programme
Episode 6: Kura the Cub of Lion Hill
Episode 7: Emergency care for Siamang Gibbon twin babies
Episode 8: Entertaining a Tiger
Episode 9: Iwani the Siamang Gibbon reuniting with his parents
Episode 10: Hippos changing homes

Trent's Wildcat Adventures (2006)
Popular Auckland Zoo zookeeper Trent Barclay has a passion for wild cats. In this series of ten episodes, Trent travels to South Africa to encounter wild cats up close and personal in their natural African habitat.

The Zoo: This Is Your Life (2008)
The Zoo spin-off series, The Zoo: This Is Your Life, celebrates five special Auckland Zoo animals. The series follows Indra the orangtan, Kashin the elephant, Kura the lioness, Zabulu the giraffe and Kito the rhino. It features archive video footage and photos, and interviews current and former keepers. All stories feature highs and lows including births and traumatic deaths, stressful journeys, life-threatening illness and daring escapes.

Episodes

DVD releases
Best Of The Zoo: Highlights 1, 2, 3
Best Of The Zoo 2: Highlights 4, 5, 6
Best Of The Zoo 3: Highlights 7, 8, 9
Best of The Zoo 4: The Complete Series 10 (2011)
Best of The Zoo 2012: Series 12 (2012)
Best of the Zoo: Box Set - Highlights from Series 1 - 9; Zoo Babies & Raising Baby Iwani
Zoo Babies & Raising Baby Iwani
The Zoo: This Is Your Life

Awards

Qantas Media Awards
Winner (2004): Best Information Programme
Winner (2001): Finalist
Winner (2000): Finalist

NZ TV Awards
Winner (2001): Most Popular Family Programme

TV Guide 'Best on the Box'
Winner (2007): Favourite Documentary Series
Winner (2006): Favourite Documentary Series
Winner (2005): Favourite Documentary Series
Winner (2004): Favourite Documentary Series
Winner (2003): Favourite Documentary Series
Winner (2002): Favourite Documentary Series
Winner (2001): Favourite Documentary Series

References

External links
TVNZ Official Zoo webpage
Auckland Zoo website The Zoo TV Show

Television series about mammals
New Zealand documentary television series
TVNZ original programming
Television series by Greenstone TV